Ralph William Thacker (September 13, 1880 – April 12, 1962) was an American football and basketball coach.  He served as the head football coach at Central Michigan University in 1907, at Nebraska State Normal School—now known as Peru State College—in 1912, the University of Wyoming from 1913 to 1914, and Lake Forest College in 1915, compiling a career college football record of 7–22–2.  Thacker was also the head basketball Nebraska State Normal from 1911 to 1913, at Wyoming from 1913 to 1915, and at Lake Forest for the 1915–16 season.  Thacker died on April 12, 1962.

Head coaching record

Football

References

1880 births
1962 deaths
Central Michigan Chippewas football coaches
College men's basketball head coaches in the United States
Macalester Scots athletic directors
Macalester Scots football coaches
Macalester Scots men's basketball coaches
Lake Forest Foresters football coaches
Lake Forest Foresters men's basketball coaches
Olivet College alumni
Peru State Bobcats football coaches
Peru State Bobcats men's basketball coaches
Wyoming Cowboys basketball coaches
Wyoming Cowboys football coaches